Hejing County is located in the central-southern part of the Tian Shan mountains of Xinjiang, in the north-west of Bayingolin Mongol Autonomous Prefecture. It borders 15 cities and counties and is

Demographics

The population of Hejing County is about 190,000 as of 2010, and the county is home to 29 different ethnic groups including Mongol, Han, Uyghur and Hui.

Climate

Economy
Agriculture dominates the county's economy. Paprika and tomatoes are grown in abundance, the crops nourished by waters from the melting of snow in local mountains.

India-based spice company Synthite Industrial Chemicals established a processing facility in the county in 2012 with the support of the local government which cleared out of a 1,000 square foot office to provide office space and complementary electricity and communications for the company. Synthite had decided to open its first overseas production facility after becoming frustrated with the low grade variety of paprika available in India despite attempts to encourage Indian farmers to grow higher quality crops. The facility process 300,000 tons of paprika per year and employs 60 Chinese employees and three Indian employees. As of 2014 the company had expansion plans and intended to go into the cultivation of lavender and tomatoes, creating what it called a "major export hub".

Transport
Hejing is served by the Southern Xinjiang Railway.

References

External links

County-level divisions of Xinjiang
Bayingolin Mongol Autonomous Prefecture